William Patterson (December 11, 1908 – February 13, 1996) was a provincial politician from Alberta, Canada. He served as a member of the Legislative Assembly of Alberta from 1959 to 1967 sitting with the Social Credit caucus in government.

Political career
Patterson ran for a seat to the Alberta Legislature in the electoral district of Lac Ste. Anne as a Social Credit candidate in the 1959 Alberta general election. He defeated incumbent Liberal MLA John Mills and two other candidates by a wide margin to pick up the district for his party and win his first term in office.

Patterson ran for a second term in office in the 1963 Alberta general election. He won a larger popular vote easily defeating two other candidates to return to office.

Patterson ran for a third term in office in the 1967 Alberta general election. He would be defeated by Progressive Conservative candidate Hugh Horner finishing second in the four way race.

References

External links
Legislative Assembly of Alberta Members Listing

Alberta Social Credit Party MLAs
1996 deaths
1908 births